Volume II: Thirteen Songs from the House of Miracles is the second album by the Canadian indie rock band The Two-Minute Miracles.  It was released in 2001 on Teenage USA Recordings.

Track listing
 "Why We Seek the Heat of the Wave"
 "Name That Song"
 "Slow Down (Porch Mix)"
 "Meekly Mate"
 "Mother of the Airwaves"
 "Like a Forest Ranger"
 "Rayon Queen in a Nylon Dream"
 "Low Man on the Lyric Pole"
 "I Beat Your Heart"
 "Song for the Weekend Girls"
 "Eleven Toes"
 "There's Nothing Like the Glow of a U.F.O."
 "Slow Down (Meet the Band Mix)"

References

The Two-Minute Miracles albums
2001 albums
Sequel albums